General Kennedy may refer to:

Alfred Kennedy (British Army officer) (1870–1926), British Army major general
Chase Wilmot Kennedy (1859–1936), U.S. Army major general
Claudia J. Kennedy (born 1947), U.S. Army lieutenant general
James Shaw Kennedy (1788–1865), British Army general
John Kennedy (British Army officer, born 1878) (1878–1948), British Army major general
John Kennedy (British Army officer, born 1893) (1893–1970), British Army major general
John Doby Kennedy (1840–1896), Confederate States Army brigadier general
Kevin B. Kennedy Jr. (fl. 1990s–2020s), Air Force major general
Robert P. Kennedy (1840–1918), Union Army brigadier general of Volunteers
Timothy M. Kennedy (general) (fl. 1970s–2000s), U.S. National Guard brigadier general

See also
Attorney General Kennedy (disambiguation)